4AM is a radio station in Mareeba, Queensland on 558kHz AM.  4AM is also heard in Cairns.  Also they are on 1422kHz AM in Port Douglas.

On air line up
Monday to Friday
5-9am: Mick Hay Breakfast Show
9-12pm: John Laws Morning Show
12-1pm: Lunchbox Lineup with Glenn Johns
1-4pm: Gabby Stark
4-7pm: Al Kirton
7-8pm: Money News
8-12am: Talk Tonight
12-5am: Talk Overnight

Saturday

6-12pm: Saturday Breakfast including Radio Classifieds between 7 and 9.
12-6pm: The Best Songs of All Time
6-12am: Saturday Night Live with Pete Graham
12-4am: Talk Overnight
4-6am: Hi Tide Fishing Show

Sunday
6-12pm: Sunday Gold including Country Sound Souvenirs between 7 and 9.
12-6pm: Sunday Funday with Taleigha
6-12am: The Easy Mix
12-4am: Talk Overnight
4-6am: Hi Tide Fishing Show

See also
 List of radio stations in Australia

References

Radio stations in Queensland
Radio stations established in 1967
Classic hits radio stations in Australia
Atherton, Queensland